Cuvierina is a genus of gastropods belonging to the family Cuvierinidae.

The genus has almost cosmopolitan distribution.

Species:
Cuvierina astesana 
Cuvierina atlantica 
Cuvierina cancapae 
Cuvierina columnella 
Cuvierina curryi 
Cuvierina inflata 
Cuvierina intermedia 
Cuvierina jagti 
Cuvierina ludbrooki 
Cuvierina pacifica 
Cuvierina paronai 
Cuvierina torpedo 
Cuvierina tsudai 
Cuvierina urceolaris

References

Pteropoda
Gastropod genera